Henry Barry Hyde  (31 May 1854 – 12 April 1932)  was an Anglican Archdeacon in India in the  early 20th century.
 
Elwes was educated at the Royal Institution School in Liverpool;  King's College, London; and University College, Durham. After a curacy in Ashford, Kent, he was Private Secretary to Joseph Lightfoot, Bishop of Durham.  In 1887 he went out with the Bengal Ecclesiastical Department to India. In 1899 he transferred to Madras, where he was Archdeacon from 1904 to 1910.

References

19th-century Indian Anglican priests
20th-century Indian Anglican priests
Alumni of University College, Durham
Archdeacons of Madras
People educated at the Royal Institution School
1854 births
1932 deaths
Alumni of King's College London